Victor Ekpuk (born 1964) is a Nigerian-born artist based in Washington, DC. Ekpuk came to prominence through his paintings and drawings, which reflect indigenous African philosophies of the Nsibidi and Uli art forms.

Work 
Ekpuk's work frequently explores the human condition of identity in society. It draws upon a wider spectrum of meaning that is rooted in African and global contemporary art discourses. In 1989 Victor received his Bachelor of Fine Art degree (BFA), Obafemi Awolowo University, Ife, Nigeria, where he first explored the aesthetic philosophies of Nsibidi. Its economy of lines and encoded meanings led him to further explore drawing as writing, and to the invention of Ekpuk's own Glyphs. In a 2017 issue of Diaspora Quarterly, Visual Collaborative cited Ekpuk's work on the heritage of Africa art. In 1991, Ekpuk joined the Daily Times Nigeria (DTN), a government-controlled media outlet. Ekpuk joined DTN as an illustrator between June 17, 1991, and October 29, 1997, at the Daily Times of Nigeria, and was responsible for developing visual material for columns in the Daily Times and its related publications.  Despite the tense political climate, arising from authoritarian military rule in Nigeria, Ekpuk delivered several thought-provoking satirical designs that traversed the political terrain in the country. His unique style consisted of political cartooning and his own unique Nsibidi inspired illustration. A notable example of illustrations from Ekpuk's time with DTN are from The New Agenda: Behind Abacha’s Game-Plan, an article covering the bloodless coup d'état that removed Ibrahim Babangida from his seat as military head of state.

Images

Collections 
His artworks are in private and public collections, such as Smithsonian Institution National Museum of African Art, Newark Museum, The World Bank, University of Maryland University College, Hood Museum, United States Art in Embassies Art Collection and the Fidelity Investment Art Collection.

Exhibitions 
Ekpuk's work have been featured at venues including: Krannert Art Museum, Champaign, Illinois; The Fowler Museum, Los Angeles; Museum of Art and Design (MAD), New York City; Newark Museum, New Jersey; The World Bank, Washington DC; Smithsonian Institution, National Museum of African Art, Washington DC; New Museum of Contemporary Art, New York City; Johannesburg Biennial, South Africa.

2017: Treasures of Islam In Africa From Timbuktu to Zanzibar, Institut Du Monde Arabe, Paris, France
2017: These Moments", Morton Fine Art, Washington, DC
2016: "Drawing Memory", Sixfold Symmetry, Pattern in Art and Science, Frances Young Tang Teaching Museum, Skidmore College, Saratoga Springs, New York
2015: Portraits: A solo exhibition by Victor Ekpuk, Sulger-Buel Lovell Gallery, Surrey Row, London (29 September – 24 October)
2014: Auto-Graphics: Recent Drawings by Victor Ekpuk, Krannert Art Museum,  University of Illinois at Urbana-Champaign (24 January – 27 July)
2013: Reminiscences and Current Musings, Morton Fine Art, Washington DC, USA (13 September – 8 October)
2013: Drawing Memories, Turchin Center for Art, Appalachian State University, North Carolina, USA
2011: Drawing Metaphors, James Madison University, Harrisonburg, Virginia, USA
2009: Of Lines and Life, The Richard F. Brush Gallery, University of St. Lawrence, Canton, New York
2009: Victor Ekpuk, Long View Gallery, Washington DC, USA
2008: Open Studio, Thami Mnyele Foundation, Amsterdam, The Netherlands
2006: Drawing From Within, Galerie 23, Amsterdam, The Netherlands 
2005: Storylines: Drawings of Victor Ekpuk, Montgomery College, College Park, Maryland, USA
2004: Trans/Script: The Art of Victor Ekpuk, Brandeis University, Boston, Massachusetts, USA
1998: Songs, 18th Street Arts Complex, Santa Monica, California, USA. (Sponsored by The Rockefeller Foundation, UNESCO-ASCHBERG Bursaries for Artists and 18th Street Arts Complex International Circle)
1995: Windsongs, French Cultural Center, Lagos, Nigeria

References

External links
Victor Ekpuk (Official studio website)
"Victor Ekpuk A picture worth a thousand words"

1964 births
Living people
American people of Nigerian descent
Nigerian artists
American contemporary painters
Obafemi Awolowo University alumni
Artists from Washington, D.C.
Painters from Washington, D.C.